Giacomo Theodoli or Giacomo Teodolo (1594–1643) was a Roman Catholic prelate who served as Archbishop (Personal Title) of Forlì (1635–1665)
and Archbishop of Amalfi (1625–1635).

Biography
Giacomo Theodoli was born on 14 Mar 1594 in Rome, Italy.
On 7 Apr 1625, he was appointed during the papacy of Pope Urban VIII as Archbishop of Amalfi.
On 20 Apr 1625, he was consecrated bishop by Ottavio Bandini, Cardinal-Bishop of Porto e Santa Rufina. 
On 7 May 1635, he was appointed during the papacy of Pope Urban VIII as Archbishop (Personal Title) of Forlì.
He served as Bishop of Forlì until his resignation in 1665. 
He died in Rome, Italy.

Episcopal succession

References

External links 
 (for Chronology of Bishops) 
 (for Chronology of Bishops)  
 (for Chronology of Bishops) 
 (for Chronology of Bishops)  

17th-century Italian Roman Catholic bishops
Bishops appointed by Pope Urban VIII
1594 births
1667 deaths
Bishops of Forlì